Shai Azoulay (born in 1971) is an Israeli painter. Azoulay lives and works in Jerusalem and is a faculty member of the Fine Art Department of The Bezalel Academy of Arts and Design.

Biography
Azoulay was born in 1971 in Kiryat Shmona. His family moved to Arad when he was a child. After his army service, he traveled to the Far East, where he began to paint. He began his art studies at the Bezalel Academy of Arts and Design in the mid-1990s and graduated in 2000 with a BFA degree and in 2007 with an MFA degree.

Azoulay has exhibited both in Israel and worldwide including Tel Aviv Museum of Art (2011), ARATANIURANO Gallery, Tokyo (2013), Herzliya Museum of Contemporary Art (2018), The Israel Museum Jerusalem (2019) as well as group exhibitions in New York, London, Paris, Berlin and Rome. His works are included in public and private collections including The Israel Museum, The Tel Aviv Museum of Art, Ashdod Museum of Art, Bank Hapoalim, Israel Discount Bank, and Bank Leumi.

Azoulay is a faculty member of the Fine Art Department of the Bezalel Academy of Arts and Design (“Oman"  Haredi Extension)
  
Among the awards that he has received are Legacy Heritage Fund Prize for a Young Artist, Tel Aviv Museum of Art, Tel Aviv (2007), The Osnat Mozes Prize for Painting for a Young Artist, The Artists House, Jerusalem (2007), Creative Encouragement Award, Ministry of Culture and Sport (2011), Ministry of Culture Award (2018) and The Israeli Lottery  'Landau Prize'  for arts and science (2020)

Azoulay lives and works in Jerusalem. He is married to Daniella Azoualy, a ceramic artist. Together they have six children. His brother is the actor Golan Azoulay.

Work
In their recommendation to reward Azoulay with the prize for a young artist, the members of the Osnat Mozes committee commented that they "...were deeply impressed by Azoulay’s command of painterly skills, his knowledge of the history of painting, and of the contemporary critical discourse."  They further noted: "In his paintings, Shai Azoulay moves along a narrow thread stretched between historical narrative and intimate-human stories. With a seemingly gentle and ironic touch he deconstructs modernist and national mythologies, while reconstructing from them refreshing pictures lacking pretension which reveal as if for the first time the possibility of creating a dynamic world.

In her essay for Azoulay's exhibition "Closer to the Sun", Michal Shachani Yacobi states "The relationship between the painting and Hasidism, or between painting and tradition and faith, occupies Azoulay in his works. He uses them to reexamine concepts, rabbinical homilies, and stories borrowed from the worlds of Torah and Jewish mysticism."

Azoulay's has a spanish mother and a moroccan father. When Azoulay was 8 years old, the family moved from Kiryat Shmona to Arad, located in the Negev desert. He later depicted these landscapes in his works. The desert is "so active, but under the surface," he says; it is "working from the quiet."

Upon completion of his requisite three-year army service, Azoulay traveled across Asia, being inspired to become an artist while in Thailand. He went on to attend Bezalel Academy of Arts and Design. Around the time of his graduation with an MFA in 2007, he began to become more religiously observant. Being religiously observant is unusual in the Israeli art scene, of which he is a leading figure.

Azoulay is a follower of the 19th century Jewish mystic, teacher, and storyteller, Rabbi Nachman of Breslov, a key influencer in the development of Breslov Hasidic Judaism.

Exhibitions

Select solo exhibitions
 Shai Azoulay – Outpost, Jerusalem Artists House, 25 October – 7 December 2003
 Shai Azoulay, Jerusalem Artists House, 13 October – 24 November 2007
 A Whole Heart is a Broken Heart, Sotheby's, Tel Aviv, 17 May –7 June 2012
 Guided Imagery, Inga Gallery of Contemporary Art, Tel Aviv ,20 March – 15 May 2014
 Dos, Inga Gallery of Contemporary Art, 14 April – 21 May 2016
 Shortcuts, Meislin Projects, NY, USA, 10 November 2016 – 27 January 2017
 Shai Azoulay: A Dwelling Down Below, Herzliya Museum of Contemporary Art, Herzliya, 24 February – 3 June 2018
 Shai Azoulay: Kitzur Schulchan Aruch, Inga Gallery of Contemporary Art, 6 September – 2 November 2019

Group exhibitions
 Group Exhibition, Art Cube, The Artists' Studio, Jerusalem, December 2003
 Lights, Israel Museum, Jerusalem, 2005
 Group Exhibition, Art Cube, The Artists' Studio, Jerusalem, 5–19 May 2006
 The Other Sea, Artists' House, Jerusalem, 21 April- 2 June 2007
 Salame, Graduate Show 007, Bezalel Gallery, Tel Aviv, 31 May- 30 June 2007
 Young Israeli Art: Recipients of the Legacy Fund Prize, Helena Rubinstein Pavilion for Contemporary Art, Tel Aviv Museum of Art, Tel Aviv, 2007
 Mermaid, Inga Gallery of Contemporary Art, Tel Aviv, 17 July- 23 August 2008 
 Group Exhibition, Artist Studios, Jerusalem, 11 September - 28 November 2008 
 Constellation: Israeli Contemporary Art, Ermanno Tedeschi Gallery, Turin, Italy, 17 February - 24 March 2009  
 Women becomes tree, Inga Gallery of Contemporary Art, Tel Aviv, 27 May - 27 June 2009 Artists: Gottlieb Azoulay, Daniella  |  Azoulay, Shai  
 1 + 1, Art Center - Art Academy, Jerusalem, 5 September- 1 October 2009 Artists: Azoulay, Shai  |  Gottlieb Azoulay, Daniella   
 With this Ring - Wedding Ceremonies in Contemporary Art, Museum of the Jewish People at Beit Hatfutsot, Tel Aviv 25 February - 25 April 2010
 'Rupture and Repair, Artists' House, Jerusalem, 8 May - 10 July 2010
 Comfort Scapes, Art Cube, The Artists' Studio, Jerusalem, 25 November 2010 - 15 January 2011
 Superpartners, Tel Aviv Museum of Art, Tel Aviv, 8 September - 8 October 2011 Artists: Azoulay, Shai  |  Israel, Reuven
 New Directions, Mani House, Tel Aviv, Israel, 2011 
 Nimrod's Descendants, Artists' House, Jerusalem, 27 October 2011 - 14 January 2012
 Prizes in Art and Design from the Ministry of Science, Culture and Sport, 2011, Petach Tikvah Museum of Art, Petach Tikva, 31 August - 17 November 2012
 Now Now, The Jerusalem Biennale for Contemporary Jewish Art, Jerusalem, 15 September - 31 October 2013
 The Dead or Alive Gallery, City Gallery Kfar Saba, Kfar Saba, 21 November - 25 December 2013
 Mazal U'Bracha- Myth and Superstition in Contemporary Israeli Art, Diaspora Museum, Tel Aviv, 2014
 The Museum Presents Itself 2, Israeli Art from the Museum Collection, Dina and Raphael Recanati Family Foundation Galleries Herta and Paul Amir Building, Tel Aviv Museum of Art, Tel Aviv, 2015
 Akhshav, Stein Rose Fine Art Gallery, NY, USA, 23 April - 3 May 2015
 The Circle of Life, Kunstwerk Carlshütte, Büdelsdorf, Germany, 4 June - 9 October 2016
 Checkers, Rosenbach Contemporary, Jerusalem, 15 September - 30 October 2016 Artists: Gold, Jonathan | Azoulay, Shai
 Repositioning: Old Objects, New Artworks, L.A. Mayer Museum for Islamic Art, Jerusalem, Israel, 2017
 Amba, Inga Gallery of Contemporary Art, Tel Aviv, 1 September - 21 October 2017
 Scenes from Family Life: Works from the collections of Israel Discount Bank and contemporary artists, Eretz Israel Museum, Ramat Aviv, Tel Aviv, 2018
 New in the Collection, Israel Museum, Jerusalem, 3 December 2018 - 23 March 2019
 Group Exhibition, The Judaica Museum, Tel Aviv University, 2019
 'Naked Soul: Chaïm Soutine and Israeli Art, Mishkan Museum of Art, Kibbutz Ein Harod, 11 September 2019 - 21 March 2020
 Group Exhibition, Ashdod Museum of Art, 2019
 The Artist's Choice, Inga Gallery of Contemporary Art, Tel Aviv, 21 February - 23 March 2019

Awards and prizes 

 2006-2007 Creativity Grant, Bezalel Academy of Arts and Design, Tel Aviv
 2007 Legacy Heritage Fund Prize for a Young Artist, Tel Aviv Museum of Art, Tel Aviv
 2007 The Osnat Mozes Prize for Painting for a Young Artist, The Artists House, Jerusalem
 2008-2010 The Artist Teacher Prize, Ministry of Culture and Sport
 2010 Artis Grant Recipient
 2011 Creative Encouragement Award, Ministry of Culture and Sport
 2018 Ministry of Culture Award
 2020 The Israeli Lottery  'Landau Prize'  for arts and science
 2020 The Foundation for Independent Artists

Collections
 The Israel Museum, Jerusalem
 Tel Aviv Museum of Art
 Ashdod Museum of Art
 Taguchi Art Collection, Japan
 Salsali Private Museum, Dubai
 Rivka Saker & Uzi Zucker  Art Collection
 The Dubi Shiff Art Collection
 Oli Alter Private Collection
 Zila & Giora Yaron Art Collection
 Hagit & Ofer Shapira Collection
 Rose Art Museum, Brandeis University, Waltham, MA
 Matthew Bronfman Private Collection
 Bank Leumi Art Collection
 Israel Discount Bank Art Collection
 Bank Hapoalim Art Collection

References

External links

The Jerusalem Artist's House
The Israel Museum

1971 births
Living people
People from Kiryat Shmona
Bezalel Academy of Arts and Design alumni
Academic staff of Bezalel Academy of Arts and Design
Artists from Jerusalem
20th-century Israeli painters
21st-century Israeli painters
Jewish Israeli artists
Jewish painters

he:שי אזולאי (צייר)